is a Japanese professional footballer who plays as a winger for Premier League club Brighton & Hove Albion and the Japan national team.

Club career

Early years
Born in Kanagawa, Mitoma grew up in the Kawasaki area and joined the Frontale academy at the U10 level. Offered a promotion from the U-18s to the senior team coached by Yahiro Kazama, he instead chose the University of Tsukuba, a Japanese university football powerhouse who had recently produced Frontale stalwarts such as Shogo Taniguchi and Shintaro Kurumaya. Mitoma professed to feel unprepared to enter professional football at age 18, citing the struggles of fellow Kawasaki academy products Ko Itakura and Koji Miyoshi to win regular playing time with the senior squad. He wrote his university thesis on dribbling.

During his time at Tsukuba, Mitoma was selected to represent Japan at the 2017 and 2019 Universiade tournaments, as well as the 2018 Asian Games and the 2019 Toulon Tournament with the under-23 national team. Playing in the Kanto University Soccer League with Tsukuba, he was named to the all-league XI in his final three seasons while majoring in physical education. In addition, Tsukuba appeared in the 2016 and 2017 Emperor's Cup tournaments making an upstart run to the round of 16 in the latter edition, upsetting J.League clubs YSCC Yokohama, Vegalta Sendai (against whom Mitoma scored a brace), and Avispa Fukuoka along the way. While enrolled in college, Mitoma also occasionally joined Frontale's senior team for training sessions as a Special Designated Player starting in his sophomore year, appearing in a single J.League Cup match in 2019.

Kawasaki Frontale
In July 2018, Mitoma agreed on a professional contract with Kawasaki Frontale senior team starting in 2020. He made his official pro debut on the opening matchday of the 2020 J1 League and quickly established himself after the league resumed following the COVID-19 outbreak,, becoming the first rookie to reach double digits in goals in the first division since Yoshinori Muto.

Brighton & Hove Albion
On 10 August 2021, Mitoma joined Premier League side Brighton & Hove Albion on a four-year deal, joining Union SG on loan for the first year. He scored his first goal for Union SG on 16 October, where he scored a hat-trick in a 4–2 home victory over Seraing.

On 13 August 2022, Mitoma made his Premier League debut for Brighton, coming on as a 75th-minute substitute for Leandro Trossard in a 0–0 draw with Newcastle United at the Falmer Stadium. He made his first start for Albion on 24 August, playing 67 minutes of the 3–0 away win over League One side Forest Green Rovers in the EFL Cup second round. He made his first Premier League start on 29 October, setting up Leandro Trossard's fifth minute opener in the eventual 4–1 home win over Chelsea. A week later, he scored his first goal for the Seagulls, heading them level from Adam Lallana's cross in the eventual 3–2 away win over Wolves. Mitoma also helped Brighton in both other goals with his run into the box creating Pascal Groß's 83rd minute winner. Mitoma scored again in Brighton's next match four days later, putting Albion in front in the eventual 3–1 away win over Arsenal in the EFL Cup third round. He scored his first home goal on 31 December, giving Brighton a lifeline in the eventual 4–2 home loss against Arsenal. He later had a goal ruled out for offside which would have cut the Gunners' lead to one. On 29 January 2023, Mitoma's 91st-minute winner at home in the fourth round of the FA Cup saw Brighton defeat the cup holders Liverpool 2–1. On February 5, he scored the late winning goal in a 1–0 victory over AFC Bournemouth  in the Premier League.

International career
After being capped at youth level, Mitoma was called up to the Japan senior squad for the first time in November 2021 for 2022 World Cup qualifiers against Oman. He made his debut on 16 November, coming on as a substitute in a 1–0 away win over Oman.

On 24 March 2022, Mitoma scored his first two international goals in a 2–0 World Cup qualification win against Australia. Coming from the bench on 86th minute, the winger opened the score three minutes later. He scored another during added time. This win confirmed Japan's qualification for the 2022 FIFA World Cup. Mitoma's double offered him his First "A" international titularisation at the following game, five days later, against Vietnam.

On 1 November, Mitoma was named in Japan's 26-man squad for the 2022 FIFA World Cup. In the last group game which came against Spain on 1 December, he assisted Ao Tanaka's winner that saw Japan qualify to the round of 16 as group winners. The goal came with controversy, originally being ruled out for the ball going out of play, VAR awarded the goal giving the reason that the curvature of the ball was hanging over the chalk.

Career statistics

Club

International

Scores and results list Japan's goal tally first, score column indicates score after each Mitoma goal.

Honours
Kawasaki Frontale
J1 League: 2020
Emperor's Cup: 2020
Japanese Super Cup: 2021

Individual
J.League Best XI: 2020
Japan Pro-Footballers Association awards: MVP, Best XI (2022)

References

External links

Kaoru Mitoma at Kawasaki Frontale (in Japanese)

1997 births
Living people
University of Tsukuba alumni
Japanese footballers
Association football people from Kanagawa Prefecture
Association football wingers
J1 League players
Belgian Pro League players
Premier League players
Kawasaki Frontale players
Brighton & Hove Albion F.C. players
Royale Union Saint-Gilloise players
Olympic footballers of Japan
Japan youth international footballers
Japan international footballers
Footballers at the 2018 Asian Games
Asian Games silver medalists for Japan
Asian Games medalists in football
Medalists at the 2018 Asian Games
Footballers at the 2020 Summer Olympics
Japanese expatriate footballers
Expatriate footballers in England
Expatriate footballers in Belgium
Japanese expatriate sportspeople in England
Japanese expatriate sportspeople in Belgium
2022 FIFA World Cup players